The minister of Canadian heritage is the minister of the Crown who heads Canadian Heritage, the department of the Government of Canada responsible for culture, media, sports, and the arts.

History
The position was created in 1996 to combine the posts of minister of multiculturalism and citizenship and minister of communications. The "status of women" was merged from the minister responsible for the status of women in 2006. In 2008, the status of women portfolio was transferred to a minister of state.

On August 16, 2013, the multiculturalism portfolio was assigned to Jason Kenney, who was appointed minister for multiculturalism in addition to his other portfolios.

Those portfolios and responsibilities such as for the Canadian Race Relations Foundation, were returned to the heritage minister with the swearing in of the 29th Canadian Ministry in November 2015. The heritage minister also gained responsibility for the National Capital Commission, which was formerly under the senior Ottawa-area cabinet minister under the Harper government; and the Canadian secretary to the Queen, which was previously under the Privy Council Office.

Traditionally, the minister attends the Juno Awards to present the awards for Breakthrough Artist and Breakthrough Group Of The Year.

List of ministers
Key:

Responsibilities
Prior to 2003, their responsibilities included National Parks and historic sites. The Minister of Canadian Heritage is responsible for:

General duties
The minister's general powers, duties, and functions are set out by section 4 of the Department of Canadian Heritage Act, which provides as follows:

(1) The powers, duties and functions of the Minister extend to and include all matters over which Parliament has jurisdiction, not by law assigned to any other department, board or agency of the Government of Canada, relating to Canadian identity and values, cultural development and heritage.

(2) The Minister’s jurisdiction referred to in subsection (1) encompasses, but is not limited to, jurisdiction over
the promotion of a greater understanding of human rights, fundamental freedoms and related values;
multiculturalism;
the arts, including cultural aspects of the status of the artist;
cultural heritage and industries, including performing arts, visual and audio-visual arts, publishing, sound recording, film, video and literature;
national battlefields;
the encouragement, promotion and development of sport;
the advancement of the equality of status and use of English and French and the enhancement and development of the English and French linguistic minority communities in Canada;
state ceremonial and Canadian symbols;
broadcasting, except in respect of spectrum management and the technical aspects of broadcasting;
the formulation of cultural policy, including the formulation of cultural policy as it relates to foreign investment and copyright;
the conservation, exportation and importation of cultural property; and
national museums, archives and libraries.

In addition, sections 42 to 44 of the Official Languages Act confer certain other responsibilities on the minister of Canadian heritage (see minister responsible for Official Languages (Canada)).

References

Sources
Our Ministers and Secretaries of State

Canadian Heritage, Minister of
Canadian culture
Culture ministers